Eric Reeves (born 1950) is an American academic who is professor emeritus of English Language and Literature at Smith College in Northampton, Massachusetts. Reeves has carried out research into the politics and human rights situation in Sudan.

Education
Before being employed at Smith College, Reeves received degrees in English Literature from Williams College and the University of Pennsylvania.

Sudan research 
Reeves started studying politics and human rights in Sudan in 1999. He testified several times before the United States Congress, has lectured widely in academic settings, and has served as a consultant to a number of human rights and humanitarian organizations operating in Sudan. Working independently, he has written on several aspects of Sudan's recent history, in particular the Darfur genocide, and the role of the Sudanese and Chinese governments in perpetuating it. He was described as "a fierce critic" of former American President Barack Obama's policy of reconciliation with Sudan.

Reeves received a generous grant from Humanity United (Redwood City, CA) to support his research and travel. A collection of his essays on ongoing war and human destruction in Darfur appeared as A Long Day's Dying (Key Publishing, 2007).  He later published a lengthy eBook about five crucial years in the history of Sudan: "Compromising with Evil: An archival history of greater Sudan, 2007 - 2012" (www.CompromisingWithEvil.org).

Publications and awards 
His work has appeared in The New York Times, The Washington Post, The Wall Street Journal, as well as numerous academic journals. This work has led to Reeves receiving a number of honorary degrees, and many other forms of national and international recognition.

References

External links
Profile of Eric Reeves' work: http://www.sudanreeves.org/category/profiles-of-eric-reeves-work/
 March 2006 interview in Guernica magazine
 SudanReeves.org Recent writings on Darfur
 A Comprehensive Approach to Sudan: Eric Reeves, discusses the situation in Darfur, the failure to implement the Comprehensive Peace Agreement in Southern Sudan and brewing troubles in the East (01/26/06)
 January 10, 2007 interview on NPR's All Things Considered

Living people
1973 births
Smith College faculty
American academics of English literature
Human rights in Sudan
Williams College alumni